Highway 741 is a highway in the Canadian province of Saskatchewan. It runs from the Alberta border near Empress, Alberta to Highway 32 in Leader.

Highway 741 crosses the South Saskatchewan River via the Estuary Ferry.

History
Highway 741 was originally designated as part of Provincial Highway 21, which connected Leader with Macklin and Lloydminster. In the 1930s, it was renumbered to Provincial Highway 32 while the north-south section was renumbered to Provincial Highway 17. In the 1940s, Provincial Highway 32 west of Leader was decommissioned, along with the section of Provincial Highway 17 south of Macklin. The route remained unnumbered until the municipal numbering system was established in the early 1980s.

Major intersections 
From west to east:

See also 
Roads in Saskatchewan
Transportation in Saskatchewan

References 

741